Democratic revolution is a revolution that installs a democratic government.

Democratic revolution may refer also to:

Political parties
 Democratic Revolution, a Chilean political party
 Party of the Democratic Revolution, a Mexican political party

Revolutions
 1990 Democratic Revolution in Mongolia, a revolution leading to the fall of communism in Mongolia
 Hawaii Democratic Revolution of 1954, a nonviolent revolution that took place in Hawaii

See also
 Bourgeois-democratic revolution, a term used in Marxist theory
 Front for Democratic Revolution, a coalition of mass organizations in El Salvador
 National Democratic Revolution, the official agenda of the African National Congress
 New Democracy or New Democratic Revolution
 Revolutionary Party, a list of political parties